
Hans Schmidt (28 April 1877 – 5 June 1948) was a German general during World War II. He was also a recipient of the Knight's Cross of the Iron Cross with Oak Leaves of Nazi Germany.

He was in command of the German Twenty-Fourth Army on the Western Front when it surrendered in May 1945.

Decorations 
 Iron Cross (1914)
 Clasp to the Iron Cross (1939) 2nd Class (31 December 1939) & 1st Class (4 July 1940)
 German Cross Gold on 6 November 1942 as General der Infanterie zur Verwendung  (for disposition) and commanding general of the IX. Armeekorps
 Knight's Cross of the Iron Cross with Oak Leaves
 Knight's Cross on 22 September 1941 as Generalleutnant zur Verwendung (for disposition) and commander of the 260. Infanterie-Division
 334th Oak Leaves on 24 November 1943 as General der Infanterie and commanding general of the IX. Armeekorps

Notes

References

Citations

Bibliography

 
 
 
 
 

1877 births
1948 deaths
Lieutenant generals of the Reichswehr
German Army personnel of World War I
Military personnel of Württemberg
Recipients of the Knight's Cross of the Iron Cross with Oak Leaves
Recipients of the Gold German Cross
Military personnel from Ulm
Generals of Infantry (Wehrmacht)
People from the Kingdom of Württemberg
Recipients of the clasp to the Iron Cross, 1st class
German Army generals of World War II